Uğurcan Çakır (born 5 April 1996) is a Turkish professional footballer who plays as a goalkeeper for Trabzonspor, whom he captains, and the Turkey national team.

Club career

2015–16 season 
Uğurcan Çakır made his senior debut for Trabzonspor in a 1–0 loss against Rabotnicki Skopje in the UEFA Europa League qualifying stages. He would then play three matches in the Turkish Cup managing to keep two clean sheets. He then solidified himself as second choice keeper being on the bench until January, but never receiving an appearance in the Super Lig.
  
Like a majority of young Trabzonspor goalkeepers, Çakır was sent to local club affiliate 1461 Trabzon on 15 January 2016, making his senior debut for the club in a 2–1 win over Yeni Malatyaspor. Giving away a penalty and getting booked in the 79th minute, after tripping up the Yeni Striker İrfan Başaran. He went too early leading to the Yeni Malatyaspor striker scoring down the centre.
He would continue playing as Trabzon's first choice keeper in three more appearances in the Turkish League 1, but couldn't get one clean sheet conceding seven goals. He would then sustain an Ankle injury, and wouldn't return to full fitness until two months. He then played four more games for the club, before being dropped entirely as he failed to live up to expectations. His one year loan deal was caught short, and he returned to Trabzonspor 30 June 2016.

2016–17 season 
Uğurcan Çakır failed to make a single appearance in any competitions for Trabzonspor mainly due to his bad performance with 1461 Trabzon last year, and was only on the bench for two Super Lig games and the majority of Turkish Cup games.

2017–18 season 
Uğurcan Çakır made his debut for Trabzonspor at the age of 21 years on 22 September 2017 against Alanyaspor after first choice keeper Esteban Alvarado couldn't carry on playing after half time, after sustaining an injury, he would witness his side from winning 3–1 the previous half to losing 4–3 after two penalties were awarded to the opposition. He impressed the current manager Ersun Yanal, leading to him playing the last five games of the Super Lig season with twelve goals conceded and one clean sheet, and would continue to grow in his development.

2018–19 season 
Uğurcan Çakır reaffirmed his position as the second choice goalkeeper for Trabzonspor, but after first choice keeper Onur Kivrak retired on January 16, 2019, he became first choice, playing eighteen games in the Super Lig conceding twenty goals and having two clean sheets.

International career
Çakır made his debut for the Turkey national team on 30 May 2019, in a friendly against Greece, as a starter.

Honours
Trabzonspor
Süper Lig: 2021–22
Turkish Cup (1): 2019–20
Turkish Super Cup (2): 2020, 2022

References

External links
Turkish Football Federation Profile
 
 
 

1996 births
Living people
Sportspeople from Antalya
Turkish footballers
Turkey youth international footballers
Turkey under-21 international footballers
Turkey international footballers
Süper Lig players
TFF First League players
Trabzonspor footballers
1461 Trabzon footballers
Association football goalkeepers
UEFA Euro 2020 players